The yellow-throated warbler (Setophaga dominica) is a small migratory songbird species breeding in temperate North America. It belongs to the New World warbler family (Parulidae).

Description

In summer, male yellow-throated warblers display grey upperparts and wings, with double white wing bars. Their throats are yellow, and the remainder of their underparts are white, and are streaked with black on the flanks. Their heads are strongly patterned in black and white, with a long supercilium; the different subspecies may display yellow and white superciliums. Remiges and rectrices are black.

Other plumages of these birds – females immatures and non-breeding males – resemble washed-out versions of the summer males; in particular they have a less crisply defined strong head pattern. They also have less bright yellows, and dark grey feathers instead of black ones in the body plumage. Compared to many other New World warblers, sexual dimorphism is slight however.

The males' songs are clear, descending whistles. The calls are high sees or sharp chips.

Measurements:

 Length: 
 Weight: 
 Wingspan:

Ecology
These birds breed in southeastern North America, and their breeding ranges extend from southern Pennsylvania and northern Missouri, to the Gulf of Mexico. One subspecies, from northwest Florida, is resident all year round. The other populations of this species are migratory, wintering at the Gulf Coast, eastern Central America, and the Caribbean. Vagrant wintering birds are sometimes seen in northernmost South America. 

In the United States, the warblers' range differs from typical Setophaga warblers because they have a more expansive resident population in the South than other Setophaga warblers. Moreover, their breeding range is more southerly, and their wintering range more is northerly, than the other warblers in the genus. According to McKay et al., "[t]he near absence of the species from the lower Piedmont of the Carolinas and Georgia ... presents a puzzle."

The yellow-throated warbler is a woodland species with a preference for coniferous or swamp tree species, in which it preferably nests. They are insectivorous, but will include a considerable amount of berries and nectar in their diet outside the breeding season. Food is typically picked off tree branches directly, but flying insects may be caught in a brief hover.

These birds build cup-shaped nests which are built in trees, and are concealed amongst conifer needles or Spanish Moss (Tillandsia usneoides). Their clutches consist of 3–5 (usually 4) eggs.

Yellow-throated warblers will occasionally hybridize with northern parulas, resulting in a hybrid species known as Sutton's warblers. Sutton's warblers lack the black streaks bordering the breast indicative of yellow-throated warblers, and have a suffused greenish-yellow wash on their back, which is also not indicative of Yellow-throated Warblers.  The Sutton's warbler was first discovered in 1940 in West Virginia.

The yellow-throated warbler is not considered a threatened species by the IUCN.

References

External links

 
 
 
 

Setophaga
New World warblers
Native birds of the Eastern United States
Native birds of the Southeastern United States
Birds of the Dominican Republic
Birds described in 1766
Taxa named by Carl Linnaeus